Arctiocossus ligatus is a moth in the family Cossidae. It is found in Australia and South Africa.

References

Natural History Museum Lepidoptera generic names catalog

Cossinae
Moths described in 1865
Moths of Africa
Moths of Australia